Donal H Godfrey is a former elementary school student whose home was bombed in February 1964 after he was enrolled in the previously all-white Lackawanna Elementary School in Jacksonville, Florida. One man pled guilty, mechanic William Sterling Rosencrans Jr. who moved to Jacksonville in September 1963 from Indiana, and five other men were acquitted in a federal trial with an all-white jury. All were accused of being part of the Ku Klux Klan.

Godfrey's home was at the corner of Gilmore Street and Owen Avenue. He was six and in first grade. Godfrey and his mother were at home at the time of the bombing but were uninjured.

J. B. Stoner served as defense attorney for the acquitted defendants. Stoner also represented Martin Luther King Jr.'s assassin James Earl Ray.

Godfrey wrote a book about his life experiences titled Leaving Freedom to Find Peace: My Life's Journey. He was interviewed about the book on the podcast This Week in America by Ric Bratton. Author Tim Gilmore interviewed him by phone from his home in Monrovia, Liberia.

See also
Murray Hill, Jacksonville, Florida

References

Living people
Year of birth missing (living people)
People from Jacksonville, Florida
Building bombings in the United States
21st-century American memoirists